Tootoo (ᑐᑐ) is an Inuit surname.  People with the name include:

 Jordin Tootoo (born 1983), Canadian hockey player
 Hunter Tootoo (born 1963), Canadian politician

See also
 
 
 Too (disambiguation)
 Tutu (disambiguation)
 Two two (disambiguation)